= Aljoscha Long =

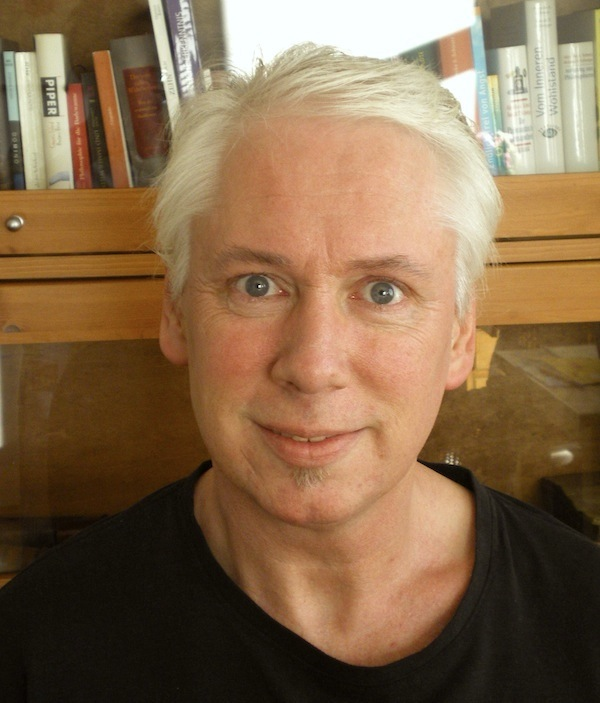
- Born: 9 September 1961 (age 64); Bonn, Germany
- Occupations: Writer, composer, martial arts teacher, professor of psychology
- Website: www.longschweppe.de

Aljoscha Andreas Long is a German writer, psychologist, philosopher, composer and martial arts teacher.

Aljoscha Long studied psychology in Toronto, Canada, philosophy and linguistics in Munich, Germany. He has been teaching cognitive psychology in Munich and Minneapolis and neuropsychology in Nanning, China. Currently he lives in Munich, where he teaches martial arts and works as a composer and writer. He is a member of Mensa.

Most of his books are written in cooperation with his schoolmate, Ronald Schweppe, a musician, meditation teacher, writer and founder of the Munich Chamber Opera.

In 2012 he married the Chinese writer, teacher and healer Long Fei (龙飞).

According to Long and Schweppe's Homepage, their books have been translated in more than 16 languages, among them Italian, Spanish, Dutch, Norwegian, Korean and Chinese.

== Works ==
- Der Kaufmann und der Rinpoche. Diederichs, ISBN 978-3424351002
- Wenn du geliebt werden willst, dann liebe. Integral, ISBN 978-3778792940
- Das Licht des Himmels in dir. Kösel, ISBN 978-3-466-34713-1
- Füttere den weißen Wolf. Kösel, ISBN 978-3-466-34538-0
- Bao, der weise Panda, und das Geheimnis der Gelassenheit. Lotos, ISBN 978-3-778-78255-2
- Gelassenheit für Anfänger. GU, ISBN 978-3-833-84622-9
- Praxisbuch NLP: Die eigenen Kräfte aktivieren und sich auf Erfolg programmieren. Südwest, ISBN 978-3-517-08943-0
- Meditation: Techniken für innere Ruhe & Entspannung. BLV, ISBN 978-3-83541-225-5
- Gib alles, was du hast – und du bekommst alles, was du willst. Gabal, ISBN 978-3-86936-242-7
- NLP macht Kinder stark. Südwest, ISBN 978-3-517-08756-6
- Nicht anstrengen – leben! Das Dao des Alltags. Heyne, ISBN 978-3-453-70118-2
- Karma. Die Gebrauchsanleitung. Lotos, ISBN 3-7787-8202-9
- Endlich frei von Angst, Gräfe & Unzer, ISBN 3-7742-6636-0
- Anleitung zum Philosophieren. Herbig, ISBN 3-7766-2274-1
- Die 7 Geheimnisse der Schildkröte. Lotos, ISBN 3-7787-8196-0
- Mein Seelentherapeut. Gütersloher, ISBN 3-579-06944-6
- Spring über den Horizont. 77 Philosophische Spiele für Herz und Verstand. Kreuz, ISBN 3-7831-2445-X
- Der Träumer, der Weise, das Innere Kind. Personale Integration. Kösel, ISBN 3-466-34480-8
